Dorcadion menradi is a species of beetle in the family Cerambycidae. It was described by Holzschuh in 1989. It is known from Turkey.

References

menradi
Beetles described in 1989